Bayswater City Soccer Club is a soccer club based in Bayswater, Western Australia. They currently compete in the National Premier Leagues Western Australia.

History
The club in its current form was formed as a result of a merger in 1980 between Lathlain Meazza (formed 1973) and Rosemount Juventus (formed 1978) becoming Rosemount Meazza. In 1981 Rosemount Meazza merged with Bayswater United (formed 1963), becoming Bayswater Inter. In 1995 Baywater Inter changed their name to Bayswater City. In 1995 Bayswater City merged with Stirling Panthers to become Bayswater City Panthers. This merger lasted until 2003 when the name Bayswater City returned.

Stadium

The club plays home matches at Frank Drago Reserve.

Current squad
As of 10 July 2021

References

Bayswater, Western Australia
Soccer clubs in Perth, Western Australia
Football West State League teams
Association football clubs established in 1963
Italian-Australian backed sports clubs of Western Australia